Sir Jonathan Lionel Percy Denny, GBE, MC (5 August 1897 – 5 August 1985) was Lord Mayor of London from 1965 to 1966.

References 
Who Was Who

External links 

 

1897 births
1985 deaths
English justices of the peace
Knights Grand Cross of the Order of the British Empire
Recipients of the Military Cross
20th-century lord mayors of London
British Army personnel of World War I
Royal Air Force personnel of World War II
Sheriffs of the City of London